The Virginia Women's Monument is a state memorial in Richmond, Virginia commemorating the contributions of Virginia women to the history of the Commonwealth of Virginia and the United States of America. Located on the grounds of the Virginia State Capitol, the monument is officially titled Voices from the Garden: The Virginia Women's Monument and features life-sized bronze statues of eleven Virginia women placed in a small granite plaza. 

The monument was first proposed in 2009 and established by joint resolution of the Virginia General Assembly in 2010. An 18-member commission, along with input from the Library of Virginia and professors of women's history, selected the women to be honored with statues sculpted by StudioEIS in Brooklyn, New York. The granite plaza and Wall of Honor were opened in October 2018 and the monument was officially unveiled with the first seven completed statues on October 14, 2019. 

The seven women were Cockacoeske, chieftain of the Pamunkey tribe; Anne Burras Laydon, Jamestown colonist; Mary Draper Ingles, frontierswoman and American pioneer; Elizabeth Keckley, seamstress and confidant of Mary Todd Lincoln; Laura Copenhaver, entrepreneur; Virginia Randolph, prominent educator; Adele Goodman Clark, suffragist and activist.

In May 2022 additional statues of Sarah Garland Boyd Jones, physician; Maggie L. Walker, businesswoman and teacher; Clementina Rind, the first female newspaper printer and publisher in Virginia; and Martha Washington, inaugural first lady of the United States, were installed.

History

Proposal 
The idea for the monument came in 2009 from Richmond native Em Bowles Locker Alsop — a writer and former actress who had been considered for the role of Scarlett O'Hara in the 1939 film Gone with the Wind. Alsop lobbied her state senator, Walter Stosch, who subsequently introduced Senate Joint Resolution No. 11 in the 2010 session of the Virginia General Assembly. The joint resolution, which created the Virginia Women's Monument Commission, was passed unanimously in both the Virginia House of Delegates and Senate of Virginia. In 2015, Alsop died at the age of 98, three years before the monument was first opened to the public.

From the text of Senate Joint Resolution No. 11:WHEREAS, throughout the ages women have been central to the perpetuation of society, and women of every nationality and race have left an indelible mark through their countless contributions, achievements, and accomplishments that have benefitted mankind; and

WHEREAS, from the founding of the Commonwealth, the genius and creativity of women and their presence and contributions have been evident in every aspect of Virginia history and the life of the people of the Commonwealth; however, they have received little appreciation, recognition, or official acknowledgement...

RESOLVED by the Senate, the House of Delegates concurring, That a commemorative commission to honor the contributions of the women of Virginia with a monument on the grounds of Capitol Square be established.The joint resolution established that the Virginia Women's Monument Commission would be composed of 19 members—the Governor, the Chair of the Senate Committee on Rules, the Speaker of the House of Delegates, representatives from the Senate and House, the Clerk of the House, and eight members of the general public. The resolution also established that the monument would be built with private funds.

Design
The monument was planned to have a total of 12 statues, chosen from every region of the state and representing the diverse achievements of women throughout the first 400 years of Virginia's history. Standing in the center of the plaza is a granite pedestal topped by a bronze sundial engraved with the names of several Virginia localities. Two benches line the sides of the oval plaza, along with a series of tempered glass panels, called the Wall of Honor, inscribed with the names of more than 200 additional important women of Virginia history.

By the time the statues of Sarah Garland Boyd Jones and Maggie L. Walker were installed in 2022, the press referred to a total of 11 figures. Included in the original plan but missing from the final design was Sally Louisa Tompkins a Richmond hospital administrator and a captain in the Confederate army.

Statues

Current monument

Wall of Honor
A further 230 women are listed on the Wall of Honor of the Monument; further nominations are currently being solicited.

List of honorees

Em Bowles Locker Alsop
Pocahontas (Matoaka)
Pauline Adams
Mollie Adams
Lucy Addison
Mary Aggie
Ella Graham Agnew
Mary C. Alexander
Sharifa Alkhateeb
Susie M. Ames
Eleanor Copenhaver Anderson
V. C. Andrews
Orie Moon Andrews
Ann (Pamunkey chief)
Grace Arents
Nancy Astor
Addie D. Atkinson
Anne Bailey
Odessa Pittard Bailey
Mary Julia Baldwin
Lucy Barbour
Hazel K. Barger
Janie Porter Barrett
Kate Waller Barrett
M. Majella Berg
Frances Berkeley
Ann Bignall
Aline E. Black
Mary Blackford
Catherine Blaikley
Florence A. Blanchfield
Anna Bland
Cynthia Boatwright
Elisabeth S. Bocock
Anna W. Bodeker
Carrie J. Bolden
Mary Marshall Bolling
Matilda M. Booker
Gladys Boone
Dorothy Rouse Bottom
Geline MacDonald Bowman
Mary Richards Bowser
Rosa D. Bowser
Belle Boyd
Sarah Patton Boyle
Mildred Bradshaw
Lucy Goode Brooks
Belle S. Bryan
Mary E. Brydon
Annabel Morris Buchanan
Dorothea D. Buck
Pattie Buford
Evelyn T. Butts
Mary Willing Byrd
Sadie Heath Cabaniss
Mary Virginia Ellet Cabell
Willie Walker Caldwell
Edith Lindeman Calisch
Christiana Campbell
Elizabeth Pfohl Campbell
Eliza J. Carrington
Maybelle Carter
Sara Carter
Virginia Cary
Ruth Harvey Charity
Jean Outland Chrysler
Patsy Cline
Matty L. Cocke
Sarah Johnson Cocke
Naomi Silverman Cohn
Cynthia B. T. Coleman
Edna M. Colson
Esther I. Cooper
Hannah Lee Corbin
Ann Cotton
Lucy Ann Cox
Daphne Dailey
Margaret Dashiell
Jo Ann Davis
Grace E. Davis
Jennie Dean
Helen Dewar
Emily W. Dinwiddie
Claudia Dodson
Bertha L. Douglass
M. Estelle Eley
Virginia Randolph Ellett
Margaret Erskine
Lettie Pate Whitehead Evans
Sarah Lee Fain
Lillie Fearnow
Rachel Findlay
Edith Fitzgerald
Ella Fitzgerald
Eve D. Fout
Ethel Bailey Furman
Elizabeth Furness
Mary Jeffery Galt
Charlotte C. Giesen
Ellen Glasgow
Meta Glass
Thelma Young Gordon
Nancy Hale
India Hamilton
Dorothy Hamm
Marion Harland
Laura Jane Harper
Jean Harris
Orie Latham Hatcher
Della I. Hayden
Mary Rice Hayes-Allen
Sally Hemings
Rachel Henderlite
Helen T. Henderson
Susanne Hirt
Anne Makemie Holden
Judith Hope
Grace Hopper
Nora Houston
Mary W. Jackson
Annabella R. Jenkins
Kate Jeter
Florence Jodzies
Barbara Johns
Julia Johns
Mary Johnston
Mary Johnston-Brittain
Georgeanna Jones
Thomasina E. Jordan
Ona Judge
May L. Keller
Emma V. Kelley
Christine Herter Kendall
Lucille Chaffin Kent
Elizabeth Key
Ellen G. Kidd
Alice Kyle
Henrietta Lacks
Anna Maria Lane
Orra Henderson Moore Gray Langhorne
Irene Leache
Edna Lewis
Elizabeth D. Lewis
Matilda Lindsay
Judith Lomax
Rebecca Lovenstein
Louise O'Connor Lucas
Mary Tyler Cheek McClenahan
Dorothy S. McDiarmid
Sarah Madden
Dolley Madison
Pauline F. Maloney
Miriam D. Mann
Bessie N. Marshall
Lucy Randolph Mason
Vivian Carter Mason
Amaza Lee Meredith
Alice duPont Mills
Jane Minor
Nannie J. Minor
Lottie Moon
Undine Smith Moore
Georgia Weston Morgan
Irene Morgan
Mary-Cooke Branch Munford
Elizabeth Nottingham
Opossunoquonuske
Elizabeth L. Otey
Mary Morton Parsons
Nina K. Peace
Mary Peake
Rebekah Peterkin
Marian Poe
Theresa Pollak
Amelia E. P. Pride
Orleana Puckett
Caroline F. Putnam
Mary Randolph
Jessie M. Rattley
Eudora Ramsay Richardson
Isabel Rogers
Wané Roonseraw
Dorothy Roy
Elizabeth Russell
Nellie Pratt Russell
Marion duPont Scott
Mary Wingfield Scott
Eleanor P. Sheppard
Grace Sherwood
Catherine Filene Shouse
Henrietta Shuck
Jean Skipwith
Isabel Dodge Sloane
Louise J. Smith
Anne Spencer
Elizabeth Allen Smith
Annie Snyder
Ora B. Stokes
Kathryn H. Stone
Queena Stovall
Mary C. Stowers
Alice Jackson Stuart
Kate Peters Sturgill
Evelyn Reid Syphax
Elizabeth N. Tompkins
Amélie Rives Troubetzkoy
Lucile Barrow Turner
Lila Meade Valentine
Elizabeth Van Lew
Mary B. Wade
Mabel Lee Walton
Melissa Warfield
Laura Martin Wheelwright
Edith Bolling Wilson
Jean Wood
Helen Wood
Temperance Flowerdew Yeardley
Martha Anne Woodrum Zillhardt

References

External links 
 
 Virginia Women's Monument Commission

Buildings and structures in Richmond, Virginia
Monuments and memorials in Virginia
Monuments and memorials to women
2019 sculptures
Outdoor sculptures in Virginia